Oleksandr Yevhenovych Panteleymonov (born 2 February 1978) is Ukrainian editor and television producer. Acting CEO of National Television Company of Ukraine (from February 20, 2013, until March 25, 2014). On March 18, 2014, Svoboda party members published a video online of Svoboda MPs attacking the acting president of the Ukrainian state broadcaster, Oleksandr Panteleymonov, and trying to force him to sign a resignation letter because of their discontent with the editorial policy of the National Television Company of Ukraine.

Biography

Early years. Education 

Oleksandr Panteleymonov was born February 2, 1978, in Kyiv.

In 1999 he graduated from the Institute of International Relations of Taras Shevchenko National University of Kyiv.

In 2003 he obtained a PhD in Political Science. During 2002–2007 years - junior researcher in Institute of International Relations.

Career 

During 2005–2010 years - project manager, director of consulting company "Agency for Humanitarian Technologies"
In 2008–2009 years - chief editor of the socio-political talk show "Freedom on Inter"

Activities in NTCU 

Concept developer, organizer of television coverage for the executive power of Ukraine ("Straight Talk", "Results of the week", "Official chronicle", "Official chronicle: Week", "Cabinet: highlight of the week", "Government in touch with citizens"," Word to regions")
Editor of telethons in time of national and religious holidays (Victory Day, the Day of the Baptism of Rus-Ukraine, Christmas, Easter)
Deputy director of NTCU (since March, 2010)
Editor in chief of TV-project "Straight talk with the country" marking the first anniversary of the inauguration of the President of Ukraine Viktor Yanukovych (February 26, 2011)
Editor of telethon "Election Night" at the First National during the parliamentary elections in 2012 (October 28–29, 2012)
Editor in chief of TV-project "Dialogue with the country" marking the 3d anniversary of the inauguration of the President of Ukraine Viktor Yanukovych (February 22, 2013)
Acting CEO of NTCU (from February 20, 2013, until March 25, 2014).
Actively introduced censorship on the National Television Company of Ukraine during EuroMaidan. Ukrainian journalist movement “Stop Censorship!” maintained that "First National Director Alexander Panteleimonov should be held personally responsible for the tragedy that killed hundreds of people and left several hundred mutilated".

See also 

National Television Company of Ukraine

References

External links 
Biography on the website of National Television Company of Ukraine
New NTCU chairman - Oleksandr Panteleymonov. And what about Harfouch? And Noyabrev?

1978 births
Living people
Ukrainian television managers
Ukrainian producers